Kylemore is a stop on the Luas light-rail tram system in Dublin, Ireland.  It opened in 2004 as a stop on the Red Line.  The stop is located on a section of reserved track in a wide central reservation on the Naas Road dual carriageway near the intersection with Kylemore road, and is virtually identical to Bluebell Luas stop.  It provides access to Walkinstown, St James Gaels GAA and Kylemore College.  
The stop is also served by Dublin Bus routes 13, 18, 51x, 68, 69, 69x, and 151.

References

Luas Red Line stops in Dublin (city)